Gauripur is a tola (locality) in village of Sukhpur Supaul district of state Bihar, India.

Villages in Supaul district